Daniel Michael Davis (born ) is Head of Life Sciences and Professor of Immunology at Imperial College London. Davis was previously Professor of Immunology at the University of Manchester. He is the author of The Secret Body, The Beautiful Cure and The Compatibility Gene. His research, using microscopy to study immune cell biology has helped understand how immune cells interact with each other. He co-discovered the immunological synapse and membrane nanotubes.

Davis has a doctorate in physics from Strathclyde University. He was professor of molecular immunology at Imperial College and director of research at the University of Manchester's collaborative centre for inflammation research. Davis is a recognised as an expert in the field by the Nature journal of immunology.

Research 
Working with Jack Strominger at Harvard University, Davis showed structured immune synapses for the Natural Killer cell. Davis also co-discovered membrane nanotubes, novel subcellular structures that allow trafficking of molecules and organelles between cells, and are exploited by pathogens.

References

External links 
 Website
 Telegraph: Davis comments on 'Cancer vaccine'
 

Living people
Academics of the University of Manchester
British immunologists
1970 births